The Miss Tierra República Dominicana 2007 pageant was held on November 1, 2007. This year, 36 candidates competed for the national crown. The winner represented the Dominican Republic at the Miss Earth 2007, which was held in Manila.

Results

Special awards
 Miss Photogenic (voted by press reporters) - Rosilendis Santana (San Cristóbal)
 Miss Congeniality (voted by Miss Dominican Republic Universe contestants) - Somairis Aquino (El Seibo)
 Best Face - Denise Rollo (La Romana)
 Best Provincial Costume - Alicia Ramos (Valverde)
 Miss Cultura - Maryann Castro (San Pedro de Macorís)
 Miss Elegancia - Sandra Eros (Comendador)

Delegates

Miss Dominican Republic
2007 beauty pageants
2007 in the Dominican Republic